A queen bee is the leader of a female group, such as a clique. The term has been applied in several social settings.

Businesses
In a business environment, "queen bee" may refer to women who are emotionally immature and view other, especially younger, women as competition. They often will refuse to help other women advance within a company by, for example, preferring to mentor a male over a female employee. Some such "queen bees" may actively take steps to hinder another woman's advancement as they are seen as direct competitors. Such tactics are sometimes referred to as heterophily (in the sense of positive preference and favoritism for opposite-sex colleagues) or the queen bee syndrome.

The term "loophole woman", coined by Caroline Bird in her book Born Female: The High Cost of Keeping Women Down (1968), has a similar meaning. Marie Mullaney defines the loophole woman as one who, "successful in a predominantly male field like law, business or medicine, is opposed to other women's attaining similar levels of success. Such success, if attained by women on a large scale, would detract from, if not substantially reduce, her own status and importance." (The term "honorary male" is related, but does not imply opposition to other women's success).

Schools
A queen bee in a school setting is sometimes referred to as a school diva or school princess. These queen bees are often stereotyped in the media as being beautiful, charismatic, manipulative, and wealthy, holding positions of high social status, such as being head cheerleader (or being the captain of some other, usually an all-girl, sports team), the Homecoming or Prom Queen (or both). The phenomenon of queen bees is common in finishing schools.

Queen bees may wield substantial influence and power over their cliques and are considered role models by clique members and outsiders. Her actions are closely followed and imitated. Sussana Stern identifies the following qualities as characteristic of queen bees:

Having overly-heightened self-esteem, which may lead to arrogance 
Being overly-aggressive, selfish, manipulative and confident
Behaving as a bully or sociopath
Being wealthy and/or spoiled
Being pretty, popular, talented, wealthy, or privileged
Being envied/hated/admired by peers (mainly female peers)

Fictional portrayals of queen bees in schools, from four different decades, include the films Heathers (1989), Jawbreaker (1999), Mean Girls (2004) and "The DUFF" (2015). The third film was partially adapted from the nonfiction book Queen Bees and Wannabes. The television series Gossip Girl is highlighted for its portrayal of Blair Waldorf as a queen bee, as she has a league of minions for friends and is frequently referred to as 'Queen B'
by her peers. Another television series Pretty Little Liars is also highlighted for its portrayal of Alison DiLaurentis as queen bee, as she has a clique, seems to be bossy and mean to people who are not her friends, and everyone treats her as a queen. She is sometimes referred to as 'Queen Ali'. Quinn Fabray from Glee is also described as a "queen bee" due to her wealth, popularity, beauty, and status as head cheerleader.

The stereotype of queen bees has also become a stock character.

In popular culture 

 Blair Waldorf, as the Upper East Side's beautiful and popular queen bee in Gossip Girl (2007-2012)
 Alison DiLaurentis, was the queen bee of her school and the most popular girl before her disappearance in Pretty Little Liars (2010-2017)
 Hanna Marin, is a formerly overweight girl who becomes a queen-bee after the disappearance of Alison DiLaurentis in Pretty Little Liars
 Cheryl Blossom, was a student, head cheerleader of the River Vixens and the self-proclaimed Queen Bee at Riverdale High School in Riverdale (2017-2023)
 Alexis "Lexi" Reed, vain, self-centered, and considers herself the Queen Bee in A.N.T. Farm (2011-2014)
 Heather Chandler, the vindictive, attractive, and popular social dictator of Westerburg High School in Heathers (1989)
 Regina George, a mean-spirited wealthy girl who is indeed a queen bee, being the leader of the Plastics in Mean Girls (2004)
 Courtney Shayne, a criminal queen bee in Jawbreaker (1999)
 Paulina Sanchez is the captain of Casper High School's cheerleading squad and a friend of Danny, Sam, and Tucker in Danny Phantom (2004-2007)
 Bonnie Rockwaller from "Kim Possible" displays such traits, much to Kim's annoyance as she herself is captain of Middleton High School's cheerleading squad.
 Rhonda Wellington Lloyd from Hey Arnold! (1996-2004)
 Muffy Crosswire from Arthur (1996-2022)

See also
Elitism
Honorary male
Mean girl
Narcissism
Sociopathy
Queen bee syndrome
Southern belle
Spoiled child
Tsundere
Valley girl

References

Further reading

Narcissism
Slang terms for women
Female stock characters
Students
Subcultures
Pejorative terms for women
Youth culture
Leadership